Pokot South Constituency is an electoral constituency in Kenya. It is one of the four constituencies in West Pokot County. The constituency was established for the 2013 General Elections. The Current Member of Parliament for Pokot South Constituency is Hon. David Pkosing Losiakou who was elected on a Jubilee Party ticket. The Pokot South Constituency borders Sigor Constituency to the East, Kapenguria Constituency to the North and West, and Elgeyo-Marakwet County to the South.

The Constituency was curved out of Sigor Constituency in West Pokot County.

Members of Parliament

List of Wards

References 
 Independent Electoral and Boundaries Commission (IEBC) Constituency Offices List of all IEBC Offices in Kenya

Constituencies in West Pokot County
Constituencies in Rift Valley Province